Victims In  were an unsigned rock band from Phoenix, Arizona who were active between 1998 and 2001.

History

Formation
Victims In  were formed in 1998 in Phoenix, Arizona by Jim Louvau, Jared Bakin and Andy Gerold. Their style of music was, according to themselves, “New School Arena Rock”.  They took influence from bands such as Mary's Window, Faith No More, Guns N' Roses and Plastic Princess. To stand out and differentiate themselves from other local bands in the area they often sported dresses and wore make-up onstage.

Discography

Chinese Pornography
April 2000 saw the band release their eagerly awaited debut album, “Chinese Pornography” to positive reviews.

Mark Matson of Sipping Soma worked alongside the band to produce the album. Both “Believe” and “New Taste” featured in the Top 10 (industrial/metal/new wave) on www.Mp3.com

In July 2000 VIE struck a deal with V&R distribution which made “Chinese Pornography” available in Best Buy stores across the United States.

Track listing:
1.	New Taste 
2.	Injected
3.	Nothing
4.	Ass+Fuck=57
5.	Believe
6.	Fragile

White Box Therapy
Victims In  spent most of 2001 at Sound Vision studios recording what was to be their second album, “White Box Therapy”, with producer/engineer Michael Beck. White Box Therapy was released in March 2002. This album saw Andy Gerold assume the position of drummer with Ken Bergeron taking over guitar duties.

Track listing:
 Euphoria 
 Cold Again
 Atmospheric Textures
 sdrawkcaB
 New Taste
 Beautiful
 untitled
 White Box Therapy (Heroine)
 White Box Therapy (Radio Edit)

Tribute albums
Victims In  featured on two tribute albums.They appeared on “Mutations: A Tribute to Alice Cooper” where they did a version of “Welcome to My Nightmare” and on “Tribute of the Year: A Tribute to Faith No More” where they covered “Strip Search”.

Non-album tracks
Dresses, dolls & lollipops

Media
November 2001 saw them line up a sponsorship deal with Pepsi, which ran the song "New Taste" on radio ads for the company's energy drink Amp.

Live performances
VIE performed regularly at the Atomic Cafe in Phoenix. They performed at the opening of Phoenix club The Machine and while recording their second album, White Box Therapy, they were invited to play on the Preaching to the Perverted tour along with Pigface, Gravity Kills and Godhead.

VIE have also shared the stage with bands such as Linkin Park, Disturbed, KMFDM, Alien Ant Farm, Sinnistar, Guttermouth, Jack Off Jill, Life of Agony, The Genitorturers, Psychotica, Dope, Drain STH, Vanilla Ice, Pitchshifter, Primer55 and Switchblade Symphony.

On June 24, 2001, their concert was webcast by Hollywoodmusic.com.

Awards
1998 - New Times Showcase Award for “Best Industrial Band”
2000 – New Times Showcase Award for “Most Likely to Make it Big”
2001 – New Times Showcase Award for “Best Hard/Modern Rock”
2001 – New Times Showcase Award for “Most Likely to Make it Big”
2001 – Aim Award for “Best Fashion”

Band members
Jim Louvau– lead vocals
Andy Gerold– guitar, drums
Jim Kaufmann– guitar
Jared Bakin– bass, guitar
Ken Bergeron (credited as Ken Virii on Chinese Pornography) – bass, guitar
Danny Diaz – drums

References

http://www.phoenixnewtimes.com/2000-03-30/music/driven-to-ecstacy/
http://www.phoenixnewtimes.com/1998-12-03/music/kind-of-a-drag/
http://www.phoenixnewtimes.com/2000-03-30/music/driven-to-ecstacy/
http://www.phoenixnewtimes.com/2002-03-28/music/hello-goodbye/
http://www.mp3.com/artist/victims-in-ecstacy/summary/
http://www.thelyricarchive.com/album/609601/Chinese-Pornography
http://interlyrics.com/artist-lyrics/681171/Victims-in-Ecstacy
http://www.swaptree.com/CD/faith-more-tribute-tribute-year-various-artists/312605/

External links
Victims In 

Rock music groups from Arizona
American industrial rock musical groups
Musical groups from Phoenix, Arizona
Musical groups established in 1998
Musical groups disestablished in 2001